DeKalb County is a county located in the northwest portion of the U.S. state of Missouri. As of the 2020 census, the population was 11,029. Its county seat is Maysville. The county was organized February 25, 1845 and named for General Johann de Kalb, Baron de Kalb, of the Revolutionary War.

DeKalb County is part of the St. Joseph, MO-KS Metropolitan Statistical Area, which is also included in the Kansas City-Overland Park-Kansas City, MO-KS Combined Statistical Area.

Geography

Adjacent counties
Gentry County (north)
Daviess County (east)
Caldwell County (southeast)
Clinton County (south)
Buchanan County (southwest)
Andrew County (west)

Major highways
 Interstate 35
 U.S. Route 36
 U.S. Route 69
 U.S. Route 169
 Route 6
 Route 31
 Route 33

Demographics

As of the census of 2000, there were 11,597 people, 3,528 households and 2,473 families residing in the county. The population density was 27 people per square mile (11/km2). There were 3,839 housing units at an average density of 9 per square mile (3/km2). The racial makeup of the county was 89.09% White, 8.86% Black or African American, 0.66% Native American, 0.17% Asian, 0.01% Pacific Islander, 0.27% from other races and 0.93% from two or more races. Approximately 1.08% of the population were Hispanic or Latino of any race.

There were 3,528 households, out of which 32.40% had children under the age of 18 living with them, 9.60% were married couples living together, 7.40% had a female householder with no husband present and 29.90% were non-families. 26.90% of all households were made up of individuals, and 14.70% had someone living alone who was 65 years of age or older. The average household size was 2.50 and the average family size was 3.04.

In the county, the population was spread out, with 20.70% under the age of 18, 8.20% from 18 to 24, 36.30% from 25 to 44, 20.90% from 45 to 64 and 13.90% who were 65 years of age or older. The median age was 38 years. For every 100 females, there were 152.30 males. For every 100 females age 18 and over, there were 168.10 males.

The median income for a household in the county was $31,654 and the median income for a family was $37,329. Males had a median income of $28,434 versus $20,207 for females. The per capita income for the county was $12,687. About 7.20% of families and 10.80% of the population were below the poverty line, including 10.80% of those under age 18 and 75.20% of those age 65 or over.

Religion
According to the Association of Religion Data Archives County Membership Report (2010), DeKalb County is sometimes regarded as being on the northern edge of the Bible Belt, with evangelical Protestantism being the most predominant religion. The most predominant denominations among residents in DeKalb County who adhere to a religion are Southern Baptists (37.63%), United Methodists (19.88%) and Community of Christ (14.82%).

2020 Census

Education

Public Schools
Maysville R-I School District – Maysville
Maysville Elementary School (K-06)
Maysville Junior/Senior High School (07-12)
Osborn R-0 School District – Osborn
Osborn Elementary School (K-06)
Osborn Senior High School (07-12)
Stewartsville C-2 School District – Stewartsville
Stewartsville Elementary School (K-06)
Stewartsville Senior High School (07-12)
Union Star R-II School District – Union Star
Union Star Elementary School (K-06)
Union Star Senior High School (07-12)

Public libraries
Cameron Public Library
DeKalb County Public Library

Politics

Local
The Republican Party controls politics at the local level in DeKalb County.

State

DeKalb County is a part of Missouri's 2nd District in the Missouri House of Representatives and is represented by J. Eggleston (R-Maysville).

DeKalb County is a part of Missouri's 12th District in the Missouri Senate and is currently represented by Dan Hegeman (R-Cosby).

Federal
All of DeKalb County is included in Missouri's 6th Congressional District and is currently represented by Sam Graves (R-Tarkio) in the U.S. House of Representatives. Graves was elected to an eleventh term in 2020 over Democratic challenger Gena Ross.

Daviess County, along with the rest of the state of Missouri, is represented in the U.S. Senate by Josh Hawley (R-Columbia) and Roy Blunt (R-Strafford).

Political culture

At the presidential level, DeKalb County is solidly Republican. Donald Trump carried the county easily in 2016 and 2020. Bill Clinton was the last Democratic presidential nominee to carry DeKalb County in 1996. The last Democrat to win majority support from the county's voters was Michael Dukakis in 1988.

Like most rural areas throughout northwest Missouri, voters in DeKalb County generally adhere to socially and culturally conservative principles which tend to influence their Republican leanings, at least on the state and national levels. In 2004, Missourians voted on a constitutional amendment to define marriage as the union between a man and a woman—it overwhelmingly passed in DeKalb County with 80.7% of the vote. The initiative passed the state with 71% support from voters. In 2006, Missourians voted on a constitutional amendment to fund and legalize embryonic stem cell research in the state—it failed in DeKalb County with 55.9% voting against the measure. The initiative narrowly passed the state with 51% of support from voters as Missouri became one of the first states in the nation to approve embryonic stem cell research. Despite DeKalb County's longstanding tradition of supporting socially conservative platforms, voters in the county have a penchant for advancing populist causes like increasing the minimum wage. In 2006, Missourians voted on a proposition (Proposition B) to increase the minimum wage in the state to $6.50 an hour—it passed in DeKalb County with 67.7% of the vote. The proposition strongly passed every single county in Missouri with 78.99% voting in favor. (During the same election, voters in five other states also strongly approved increases in the minimum wage.) In 2018, Missourians voted on a proposition (Proposition A) concerning right to work, the outcome of which ultimately reversed the right to work legislation passed in the state the previous year. 65.70% of DeKalb County voters cast their ballots to overturn the law.

Missouri presidential preference primaries

2020
The 2020 presidential primaries for both the Democratic and Republican parties were held in Missouri on March 10. On the Democratic side, former Vice President Joe Biden (D-Delaware) both won statewide and carried DeKalb County by a wide margin. Biden went on to defeat President Donald Trump in the general election.

Incumbent President Donald Trump (R-Florida) faced a primary challenge from former Massachusetts Governor Bill Weld, but won both Daviess County and statewide by large margins.

2016
The 2016 presidential primaries for both the Republican and Democratic parties were held in Missouri on March 15. Businessman Donald Trump (R-New York) narrowly won both DeKalb County and the state overall. He went on to win the presidency.

On the Democratic side, former Secretary of State Hillary Clinton (D-New York) won statewide by a small margin, but lost DeKalb County to Senator Bernie Sanders (I-Vermont).

2012
In the 2012 Missouri Republican Presidential Primary, voters in DeKalb County supported former U.S. Senator Rick Santorum (R-Pennsylvania), who finished first in the state at large, but eventually lost the nomination to former Governor Mitt Romney (R-Massachusetts). Delegates to the state convention were chosen at a county caucus, which selected a delegation favoring Santorum.

2008
In 2008, the Missouri Republican Presidential Primary was closely contested, with Senator John McCain (R-Arizona) prevailing and eventually winning the nomination. Former Governor Mitt Romney (R-Massachusetts) won the vote in Caldwell County.

Then-Senator Hillary Clinton (D-New York) received more votes than any candidate from either party in DeKalb County during the 2008 presidential primary. Despite initial reports that Clinton had won Missouri, Barack Obama (D-Illinois), also a Senator at the time, narrowly defeated her statewide and later became that year's Democratic nominee, going on to win the presidency.

Communities

 Alta Vista
 Amity
 Cameron
 Clarksdale
 Fairport
 Fordham
 Maysville (county seat)
 Oak
 Orchid
 Osborn
 Santa Rosa
 Stewartsville
 Union Star
 Weatherby
 Wood

See also
National Register of Historic Places listings in DeKalb County, Missouri

References

External links
 Digitized 1930 Plat Book of DeKalb County  from University of Missouri Division of Special Collections, Archives, and Rare Books

 
Missouri counties
St. Joseph, Missouri metropolitan area
1845 establishments in Missouri
Populated places established in 1845